Stanko Prek (1915, Solkan near Nova Gorica – 1999, Ljubljana) was a classical guitarist and composer from Slovenia.

He studied first in Ljubljana and then the Hochschule für Musik und Theater München, where he received his degree in classical guitar in 1941. In 1944 he finished composition studies with Lucijan Marija Škerjanc.

Stanko Prek was the first guitar professor at the Muzička akademija - Zagreb, Croatia (1), but also taught in Maribor and Ljubljana.

He made numerous publications, including compositions, arrangements and music theory books.

Principal works
Symphony in C sharp minor (1951)
Nocturne for symphony orchestra (1944)
Youth Suite for strings (1959)
String Quartet in G major (1966)
Nocturne for guitar (1950)
Three Hundred Folk Tunes, an anthology of folk songs (1964)
Pozdrav iz daljine (Greeting from Afar) for male choir (1954)
Pomladna pesem (Spring Song) for youth choir (1957)
Serenade for voice and guitar (or piano) (1946)

Classical guitar method
Klasična Kitara - Šola 1 (Državna založba Slovenije)
Klasična Kitara - Šola 2 (Državna založba Slovenije)
further publications are published by Državna založba Slovenije

Quotes

References

External links
 Stanko Prek (see p. 198, 199)
History of the Guitar in Former Yugoslavia (by Prof. Uroš Dojčinović)
Articles and Documents
Articles: 1 (see page 12; ref), 2 (see page 19; ref), 3 (see page 6; ref)
Programs: 1 (ref), 2 (ref)

Slovenian classical guitarists
University of Music and Performing Arts Munich alumni
1915 births
1999 deaths
20th-century classical musicians
People from the City Municipality of Nova Gorica
20th-century guitarists